Skint is a British documentary series that debuted on BBC One in 2005. The series follows the lives of Britain's poor, unemployed and homeless people as they manage day to day with little money and low job prospects. The show broadcast two series and an additional three specials.

Episodes

Series 1

Series 2

Specials

References

BBC Television shows